HME, Incorporated (Hendrickson Mobile Equipment) is a custom fire engine manufacturer in Michigan.

Hendrickson Motor Truck Company was purchased by The Boler Company in 1978 and later sold the truck manufacturing portion in 1985. After the Atonne Group, located in Wyoming, Michigan, purchased the company in 1985, the company changed to specializing in the manufacture of custom fire truck cabs and chassis. HME's fire apparatus carry the model name designations SilverFox and HME Ahrens-Fox.

HME was the first custom fire truck manufacturer to build a tilt cab model cab-over chassis and the first manufacturer to create a compressed natural gas-powered fire apparatus.

References

External links
 Official website

Motor vehicle manufacturers based in Michigan
Truck manufacturers of the United States
Fire service vehicle manufacturers
Companies based in Kent County, Michigan